LCB may refer to:
Laksamana College of Business, a college in Brunei
Lecuona Cuban Boys, a Cuban orchestra
Leonid Chernovetskyi Bloc, a political alliance in Kiev, Ukraine
Lundquist College of Business, the University of Oregon's business school
Lebanese Canadian Bank, a commercial bank in Lebanon
Liga Portuguesa de Basquetebol, a sports league in Portugal
Light Commando Battalions of the Pakistan Army
London Children's Ballet, a children's charity in London
London Commuter Belt, an alternative name for London's metropolitan area.
Lactophenol Cotton Blue, used as a stain in the examination of fungi.
Linear Current Booster, used to match photovoltaic output to motor input
Le Cordon Bleu, a culinary school.